Chahaki (also Romanized as Chāhakī) is a village in Kuhestan Rural District, Jazmurian District, Rudbar-e Jonubi County, Kerman Province, Iran. At the 2006 census, its population was 21, in 5 families.

References 

Populated places in Rudbar-e Jonubi County